José Aurelio Suárez García (born 18 December 1995) is a Spanish professional footballer who plays as a goalkeeper for Japanese club Tokushima Vortis.

Club career
Born in Gijón, Asturias, Suárez started playing football for hometown club CD Roces, moving to FC Barcelona's youth system, La Masia, in 2011. After progressing through its ranks, he was promoted to the B-team in 2014.

Suárez played his first match as a professional on 31 January 2015, in a 1–4 away win against CE Sabadell FC for the Segunda División championship. His performance was praised by the media.

On 7 July 2017, after being a regular starter in the B-side's promotion to the second level, free agent Suárez signed a four-year deal with La Liga side Girona FC. On 25 August, however, he suffered a shoulder injury which kept him out for four months.

On 18 January 2021, Suárez terminated his contract with Girona, and signed for third division side Gimnàstic de Tarragona just hours later. On 3 April, he scored a last-minute equalizer in a 2–2 home draw against Villarreal CF B.

On 12 July 2021, Suárez returned to the second division after agreeing to a two-year deal with AD Alcorcón. A backup to Dani Jiménez, he featured in three matches overall before being transferred to Japanese club Tokushima Vortis on 28 January 2022.

Club statistics

Honours
Barcelona
 UEFA Youth League: 2013–14

References

External links
 FC Barcelona official profile
 
 

1995 births
Living people
Footballers from Gijón
Spanish footballers
Association football goalkeepers
Segunda División players
Segunda División B players
FC Barcelona Atlètic players
CF Peralada players
Girona FC players
Gimnàstic de Tarragona footballers
AD Alcorcón footballers
Tokushima Vortis players
Spain youth international footballers
Spanish expatriate footballers
Spanish expatriate sportspeople in Japan
Expatriate footballers in Japan